Urban Renewal is a tribute album to singer Phil Collins, released in February 2001 in most European markets and in the United States on 25 February 2003, containing remakes of his songs by R&B and hip hop performers. Collins remarked:

Although the album itself was not a worldwide success, only charting in Germany at number three, individual singles from the album performed well in various markets, including "Another Day in Paradise" as performed by Brandy and Ray J and "In the Air Tonite" as performed by rapper Lil' Kim. A remake by Deborah Cox, "Something Happened on the Way to Heaven", was later released as a dance remix on her 2003 album, Remixed. It reached number one on the Billboard Dance Radio Airplay chart and peaked at 95 on the Billboard Hot 100.

Critical reception
The chief pop and rock critic of The Guardian, Alexis Petridis, described it as a "horrid and inexplicable album of hip-hop and R&B covers" with the "solitary redeeming track" being the version of "Sussudio". In 2006, Q magazine listed Urban Renewal as No. 3 in their list of the 50 worst albums ever.

Track listing

Charts

Weekly charts

Year-end charts

References

2001 albums
2003 albums
Phil Collins tribute albums
Albums produced by the Neptunes